The 2013 West Asian Football Federation Championship (marketed as Qatar 2013) was the 8th WAFF Championship, an international tournament for member nations of the West Asian Football Federation. The tournament was hosted by Qatar from 25 December 2013 to 7 January 2014 and the host country won the tournament for the first time.  The 2012 champions, Syria, did not defend their title.

Venues
It was announced in October 2013 that three venues would be used. On 4 December, it was announced that the Suheim Bin Hamad Stadium would not feature in the tournament anymore.

Draw
The draw took place on 11 November 2013 in Doha, Qatar. The nine teams were drawn into three groups based on team rankings. All groups included three teams each.

Participants

 (host)

Did not enter

Withdrew

Squads

Match officials
The following is the list of referees the West Asian Football Federation appointed for the tournament.

Referees

 Jameel Abdulhusin
 Wang Di
 Ali Sabah Adday Al-Qaysi
 Nagor Amir Noor Mohamed
 Abdullah Al Hilali
 Banjar Al-Dosari
 Marai Al-Awaji
 Kim Sang-Woo
 Valentin Kovalenko

Assistant referees

 Mu Yuxin
 Issa Al-Amawe
 Yaser Marad
 Samer Badr
 Mohd Kamil Tumin
 Amin Halabi
 Lee Jung-Min
 Rafael Ilyasov

Group stage
All times listed are (UTC+3)

Group A

Group B

Drawing of lots was used to determine the group winners. The draw was conducted after the final game in Group C. No determination was made by the organisers for second and third place.

Group C

Ranking of second-placed teams
At the end of the group stage, a comparison will be made between the second-placed teams of each group. The best second-placed team advance to the semifinals.

Knockout stage

Semi-finals

3rd Place Match

Final

Champion

Player awards 
Best Player:  Ali Assadalla
Top Scorer:  Boualem Khoukhi
Best Goalkeeper:  Sayed Mohammed Jaffer

Statistics

Goalscorers
6 goals
 Boualem Khoukhi

2 goals
 Fahad Al-Hajeri
 Adel Ahmed

1 goal
 Mohammad Al-Dmeiri
 Saeed Murjan
 Faisal Zaid
 Ali Assadalla
 Moayad Hassan
 Mohammed Majrashi

Own goal
  Mohamed Duaij (playing against Jordan)

Final standings

References

External links
Official website

 
2013
2013 in Asian football
2013
2013–14 in Qatari football
2013–14 in Jordanian football
2013–14 in Bahraini football
2013–14 in Kuwaiti football
2013–14 in Palestinian football
2013–14 in Lebanese football
2013–14 in Saudi Arabian football
2013–14 in Iraqi football
2013–14 in Omani football